The Ken Noyle Show is an Australian television series which aired on ABC Television. A half-hour variety series, in Sydney (on ABN-2) it aired on Thursdays, while in Melbourne (on ABV-2) it typically aired on Wednesdays.

In Melbourne the first episode aired on 24 May 1958, with guests including Beryl Meekin, Red Moore, vocalist Paul Miskell and Jancece, with competition in the 9:30PM time-slot including a feature film on HSV-7 and the first half of The Astor Show on GTV-9. Later during the run of the series it aired at 9:00PM, competed against talent programme Stairway to the Stars on HSV-7, and American sitcom Susie on GTV-9. At that point the programme was preceded on ABV-2's schedule by Faraway Look and followed by documentary series Panorama.

It is not known if any kinescope recordings exist of the series, given the erratic survival rate of ABC's 1950s-era programming.

References

External links

1958 Australian television series debuts
1958 Australian television series endings
Australian Broadcasting Corporation original programming
Black-and-white Australian television shows
English-language television shows
Australian variety television shows